Ignacio Merino Muñoz (30 January 1817 in Piura – 17 March 1876 in Paris) was a Peruvian painter who spent much of his life in Paris. He specialized in historical and costumbrista works.

Biography 
His father, Don José, was a judge, district administrator and military commander. His mother Doña Micaela, was from an aristocratic family in Trujillo. At the age of ten, he was sent to study in Paris, where he earned his bachelor's degree and became interested in art.

He studied with Raymond Monvoisin and Paul Delaroche, who inspired his interest in history painting. Also as result of Delaroche's influence, he tended to focus on themes from European history, whereas his Peruvian-themed paintings were generally in the costumbrista category.

During the 1840s, he created a series of portraits devoted to Peruvian saints, including Rose of Lima and Martín de Porres.

In 1850, he had an opportunity to study with Eugène Delacroix, and returned to Paris. He would remain there for the rest of his life. It is said that an exhibition of his costumbrista paintings served as the inspiration for Martin Paz, an adventure story by Jules Verne, which was set in Lima. Upon returning to Paris, he produced 92 wood engravings for a luxury 1854 edition of  1797 satire Lima por dentro y fuera, collaborating with Parisian printer A. Mézin and draftsman A. Jourdain. Many of these engravings, including landscapes, portraits, and popular scenes, served as studies for later canvases of costumbrista themes.

It was there he created his best-known painting, Colón ante los doctores en Salamanca, which was purchased by the government of President José Balta after winning a third-place medal at the "Exposition des Beaux-Arts". He was also inspired by European literature and created works based on the writings of Shakespeare, Sir Walter Scott and Miguel de Cervantes.

He died of tuberculosis in 1876. Having never married and without an heir, he ceded his estate to the Municipality of Lima. This included 33 paintings which, in 1925, were the first acquisitions of the newly founded "", administered by the Municipality of Lima to the present day.

References

Further reading
 Juan Bautista de Lavalle, Ignacio Merino, 1817-1917: biografía del pintor, Casa Editora M. Moral, 1917
 Juan Manuel Ugarte Eléspuru, "Ignacio Merino", Volume 33 of Biblioteca Hombres del Perú, Editorial Universitaria, 1966
 Dexter Zavalza Hough-Snee, "Ilustrando la república a través de la sátira colonial: Ignacio Merino y la reconfiguración de Lima por dentro y fuera." Estudios de sátira hispanoamericana. eds. Zavalza & Eduardo Viana da Silva. Madrid: Iberoamericana/Vervuert, 2015. pp. 87–119.

External links 

 Pinacoteca Municipal Ignacio Merino @ Lima Cultura
 Pinacoteca Municipal Ignacio Merino @ the Google Cultural Institute

Peruvian painters
1817 births
1876 deaths
Burials at Père Lachaise Cemetery
19th-century deaths from tuberculosis
People from Piura
History painters
Peruvian emigrants to France
19th-century Peruvian painters
19th-century Peruvian male artists
Neoclassical artists
Tuberculosis deaths in France
Romantic painters
Peruvian male painters